Basilio Santiago Romero (1928 – May 31, 2010) served as the third Comptroller of Puerto Rico from September 1, 1971 to August 1, 1977. Santiago was appointed by Luis A. Ferré and was succeeded by Ramón Rivera Marrero.

In 1959, he formed a law firm with Max Goldman and Marco A. Rigau, known as Rigau, Goldman & Santiago. Between 1985 and 1988, he served as Special Adviser for former mayor of San Juan, Baltasar Corrada del Río. He was a law professor at the Interamerican University of Puerto Rico School of Law for nearly 17 years.

Works
 Tratado de instrumentos negociables: Ley Uniforme de Instrumentos Negociables de Puerto Rico y Ley del Código Uniforme de Comercio de los Estados Unidos

References

1928 births
2010 deaths
Government accounting officials
People from Comerío, Puerto Rico
Puerto Rican lawyers
Puerto Rican civil servants